Greenwich Pizza, also known as Greenwich, is a pizza and pasta chain in the Philippines. It was founded in 1971 by Cresida Tueres. 

Greenwich Pizza started in 1971 as a small store at Greenhills Shopping Center in San Juan, Rizal (now part of Metro Manila). The name "Greenwich" is in tribute to its founder Cressida Tueres's first customers, which were students from the private school La Salle Green Hills that has green as its school color. In 1994, Jollibee Foods Corporation acquired 80% of Greenwich shares. Expanding further through 2011, the corporation had opened over 330 stores.

Greenwich Pizza later became a brand managed by Fresh N' Famous Foods, a subsidiary of Jollibee Foods Corporation.

See also
Jollibee Foods Corporation

References

External links

 Greenwich Pizza Delivery

Jollibee Foods Corporation brands
Fast-food chains of the Philippines
Pizza chains of the Philippines
Restaurants established in 1971
Philippine brands
1971 establishments in the Philippines
1994 mergers and acquisitions
Jollibee Foods Corporation subsidiaries